Category 2 the fourth-highest classification on the Australian tropical cyclone intensity scale is used to classify tropical cyclones, that have 10-minute sustained winds of .  71 tropical cyclones have peaked as a category 2 tropical cyclone in the South Pacific tropical cyclone basin, which is denoted as the part of the Pacific Ocean to the south of the equator and to the east of 160°E. This list does not include any tropical cyclones that went on to peak as a Category 3,  4 or 5 severe tropical cyclones, while in the Southern Pacific tropical cyclone basin.

Background
The South Pacific tropical cyclone basin is located to the south of the Equator between 160°E and 120°W. The basin is officially monitored by the Fiji Meteorological Service and the New Zealand MetService, while other meteorological services such as the Australian Bureau of Meteorology, Météo-France as well as the United States Joint Typhoon Warning Center also monitor the basin. This scale is only officially used in American Samoa, however, various agencies including NASA also use it to compare tropical cyclones. A Category 2 tropical cyclone is expected to cause catastrophic devastation, if it significantly impacts land at or near its peak intensity.

Systems

1970's

|-
| Dawn ||  ||  ||  || New Caledonia, Northern Queensland || $5 Million || 6 ||
|-
| Rosie ||  ||  ||  || Vanuatu, New Caledonia, New Zealand ||  ||  ||
|-
| Elenore ||  ||  ||  || Fiji, Tonga || || ||
|-
| Juliette ||  ||  ||  || Fiji, Tonga || || ||
|-
| Vera ||  ||  ||  || Queensland, New Caledonia || || ||
|-
| Zoe ||  ||  ||  || || || ||
|-
| Alice ||  ||  ||  || || || ||
|-
| Tina ||  ||  ||  || Fiji, Tonga ||  ||  ||
|-
| Flora ||  ||  ||  || || || ||
|-
| Gloria ||  ||  ||  || || || ||
|-
| Elsa ||  || ||  || New Caledonia, Vanuatu ||  ||  ||
|-
| Kim ||  ||  ||  || || || ||
|-
| Laurie ||  ||  ||  || || || ||
|-
| Marion ||  ||  ||  || Vanuatu || Unknown ||  ||
|-
| Norman ||  ||  ||  || || ||
|-
| Pat ||  ||  ||  || || || ||
|-
| Steve ||  ||  ||  || || || ||
|-
| Anne ||  ||  ||  || || || ||
|-
| Diana ||  ||  ||  || || || ||
|-
| Ernie ||  ||  ||  || || || ||
|-
| Fay ||  ||  ||  || Fiji ||  ||  ||
|-
| Henry ||  ||  ||  || || || ||
|-
| Kerry ||  ||  ||  || || || ||
|-
| Leslie ||  ||  ||  || || || ||
|}

1980's

|-
| Ofa || ||  ||  || || || ||
|-
| Tia || March 22 – 27, 1980 ||  ||  || || || ||
|-
| Val || March 25 – 29, 1980 ||  ||  || || || ||
|-
| Daman || ||  ||  || || || ||
|-
| Esau ||  ||  ||  ||  || || ||
|-
| Fran ||  ||  ||  || || || ||
|-
| Unnamed ||  ||  ||  || || || ||
|-
| Joti ||  || ||  || Vanuatu ||  ||  ||
|-
| Lisa ||  ||  ||  || Cook Islands || Unknown ||  ||
|-
| Saba ||  ||  ||  ||  || || ||
|-
| Harvey || February 7 – 8, 1984 ||  ||  || New Caledonia || || ||
|-
| Monica ||  ||  ||  || || || ||
|-
| Gavin ||  ||  ||  || Vanuatu, Fiji || || ||
|-
| June || ||  ||  || || || ||
|-
| Osea ||  ||  ||  || || || ||
|-
| Patsy ||  ||  ||  || || || ||
|-
| Unnamed || ||  ||  || || || ||
|-
| Zuman ||  ||  ||  || || || ||
|-
| Dovi ||  ||  ||  || || || ||
|-
| Eseta ||  ||  ||  || Vanuatu, New CaledoniaFiji, New Zealand || || ||
|-
| Delilah ||  ||  ||  || New Caledonia, New Zealand || || ||
|-
| Fili ||  ||  ||  || || || ||
|-
| Kerry ||  ||  ||  || Fiji || || || 
|}

1990's

|-
| Nancy ||  ||  ||  || Eastern Australia || || ||
|-
| Hilda ||  ||  ||  || Tuvalu, Vanuatu, New Caledonia || || ||
|-
| Rae ||  ||  ||  || Tuvalu, Fiji || Minor || 3 ||
|-
| Lisa ||  ||  ||  || Solomon Islands, Vanuatu || None || None ||
|-
| Cliff ||  ||  ||   || French Polynesia || || ||
|-
| Gene ||  ||  ||  || Cook Islands || || ||
|-
| Innis ||  ||  ||  || Tokelau, Tuvalu, Solomon Islands, Vanuatu || None || None ||
|-
| Nisha ||  ||  ||  || Cook Islands || None || None ||
|-
| Roger ||  ||  ||  || Solomon Islands, Australia, New Caledonia || || ||
|-
| Usha || March 22 – April 4 ||  ||  || || || ||
|-
| Vania ||  ||  ||  || Vanuatu || Minimal || None ||
|-
| William ||  ||  ||  || Cook Islands, French Polynesia ||  || None ||
|-
| Freda ||  || ||  || None || None || None ||
|-
| Harold ||  || ||  || Melanesia, Australia, New Zealand ||  || 7 ||
|-
| 29P ||  ||  ||  || None || None || None ||
|-
| June ||  || ||  || Fiji ||  || ||
|-
| Lusi ||  || ||  || Vanuatu, Fiji ||  None ||  None ||
|-
| Nute ||  || ||  || None ||  None ||  None ||
|-
| Pam ||  || ||  || Cook Islands ||  Minor ||  None ||
|-
| Ursula ||  || ||  || French Polynesia ||  Minor ||  None ||
|-
| Veli ||  || ||  || French Polynesia ||  Minor ||  None ||
|-
| Wes ||  || ||  || Cook Islands, French Polynesia ||  None ||  ||
|}

2000's

|-
| Olinda ||  ||  ||  || None || || ||
|-
| Pete ||  || ||  || None || || ||
|-
| Leo ||  ||  ||  || French Polynesia || Minimal || None ||
|-
| Oma || February 20 – 22 ||  ||  || Cook Islands || Minor || None ||
|-
| Sose ||  ||  ||  || Vanuatu, New Caledonia, Australia || || ||
|-
| Des || March 5 – 7 ||  ||  || New Caledonia ||  None ||  ||
|-
| Fili ||  ||  ||  || Tonga || None || None ||
|-
| Grace ||  ||  ||  || || || ||
|-
| Urmil ||  ||  ||  || French Polynesia || || ||
|-
| Zita ||  ||  ||  || French Polynesia || || ||
|-
| Arthur ||  ||  ||  || Samoan Islands, French Polynesia || || ||
|-
| Becky ||  ||  ||  || Solomon Islands, VanuatuNew Caledonia || || ||
|-
| Cliff ||  ||  ||  || Fiji || || ||
|-
| Elisa ||  ||  ||  || || || ||
|-
| Joni ||  ||  ||  || Cook Islands || || ||
|-
| Ken ||  ||  ||  || || || ||
|-
| Jasper ||  ||  ||  || New Caledonia || || || 
|-
| Lin ||  ||  ||  || Fiji, Tonga || || ||
|-
| Mick ||  ||  ||  || Fiji || || ||
|}

2010's

|-
| Vania ||  ||  ||  || Fiji, Vanuatu, New Caledonia, New Zealand || || ||
|-
| Zaka ||  ||  ||  || None || None || None ||
|-
| Cyril ||  ||  ||   || Fiji, Tonga || || ||
|-
| Daphne ||  ||  ||   || Vanuatu, Fiji || || 5 ||
|-
| Edna ||  ||  ||  || New Caledonia, New Zealand  || || ||
|-
| Kofi ||  ||  ||  || Fiji, Tonga  || || ||
|-
| Niko ||  ||  ||  || French Polynesia  || || ||
|-
| Solo ||  ||  ||  || Solomon Islands, New Caledonia || || ||
|-
| Tatiana ||  ||  ||  || None || || ||
|-
| Ella ||  ||  ||  || Samoan Islands, Tonga, Wallis and Futuna || || ||
|-
| Mona ||  ||  ||  || Solomon Islands, Fiji || || ||
|-
| Sarai ||  ||  ||  || Tuvalu, Fiji, Tonga, Niue, Southern Cook Islands || || ||
|}

2020's

|-

| Wasi ||  ||  ||  || Wallis and Futuna, Samoan Islands ||  ||  || 
|-
| Gretel ||  ||  ||  || New Caledonia, Norfolk Island, New Zealand ||  ||  || 
|-
| Zazu ||  ||  ||  || Samoan Islands, Tonga, Niue ||  ||  ||
|-
| Lucas ||  ||  ||  || Vanuatu, New Caledonia || Unknown || 2 || 
|-
| 09F ||  ||   ||  || Fiji ||  ||  ||  
|-
| Ruby ||  ||  ||  || New Caledonia ||  ||  || 
|-
| Fili ||  ||  ||  || New Caledonia ||  ||  ||  
|-
| Irene ||  ||  ||  || New Caledonia, Vanuatu ||  ||  || 
|}

Other systems
In addition to the tropical cyclones listed above, the Australian Bureau of Meteorology considers Tropical Cyclone Nancy 1990 to have been a Category 2 tropical cyclone while in the basin.

See also
List of Category 2 Atlantic hurricanes
List of Category 2 Pacific hurricanes

Notes

References

External links

South Pacific